Muhibb ud-Din al-Khateeb (or Muhibb al-Din al-Khatib) (1886–1969) was a Syrian Salafi writer. He was the maternal uncle of Ali al-Tantawi and was the author of the "hate filled" anti-Shia pamphlet entitled al-Khutoot al-‘Areedah (The broad lines of the foundations upon which the religion of the Imami Twelver Shiites is based). He has been described as "one of the most influential anti-Shiite polemicists of the twentieth century."

In 1916, he was made the editor of Al Qibla, the official newspaper of Sharif Hussein.

Early life and education
Born in Damascus in July 1886 Al Khatib was the son of a Damascene ulema Abu Al Fath Al Khatib. Al Khatib received secondary education in his hometown and attended Maktab Anbar, a very well-known educational institute, where he studied modern sciences, Ottoman Turkish, French and some Persian. During his studies in Damascus he became one of the pupils of Salafi scholar Tahir Al Jazairi. Al Khatib continued his education at a state school in Beirut. In 1905 he went to Istanbul to study law and literature and also, founded the Society of Arab Awakening with Aref Al Shihabi there.

Career and activities
In 1907 Al Khatib moved to Yemen where he served as a translator for the British consulate and became a member of Rashid Rida's Ottoman Council Society based in Cairo. Al Khatib returned to Istanbul in 1909 and established a literary society. He was named the assistant general secretary of the Decentralization Party which was founded in Syria in 1913. Next year while he was going to Najd and Iraq he was arrested by the British and deported to Basra where he was jailed until July 1916. Following his release he first went to Egypt and then to Mecca where he met Sharif Hussain and cofounded a newspaper entitled Al Qibla in 1916 which he edited until 1920. In November 1917 Al Khatib launched another weekly newspaper, Al Irtiqa. In 1919 he moved to Damascus where he participated the Arab Youth association and became a member of its central committee. The same year he also served as the editor-in-chief of the official newspaper Al Asima.

Al Khatib settled in Cairo in 1921 as result of his clash with the King of Syria and Iraq Emir Faisal. He was appointed editor-in-chief of Al Ahram and served in the post for five years. He and another Syrian émigré Abdul Fattah Qattan established a publishing company, Salafi Publishing House, and a bookstore with the same name in Cairo. Al Katib launched Al Zahra and Al Fath magazines. In 1928 he assumed an editorial role for another magazine, Al Minhaj, which was banned by the government in 1930.

Khatib also published a book, Al Khuttut al-’Arida li al Shi‘a al Ithna ‘Ashiriyya (Arabic: Petitions against the Twelve Shiites).

Views and death
Al Khatib was an Arab nationalist and was part of Arabist-Salafi circles in Cairo. He died in Cairo in December 1969.

See also
Criticism of Twelver Shi'ism
Shi'a–Sunni relations

References

External links
al-Qibla

Bibliography

Egyptian journalists
Egyptian academics
Egyptian scholars
Egyptian Muslims
Egyptian Sunni Muslims
Critics of Shia Islam
1969 deaths